A Good Business Deal is a 1915 American short silent film directed by  B. Reeves Eason.

Cast
 Joseph Galbraith
 Jack Richardson
 Vivian Rich

External links

1915 films
1915 short films
American silent short films
American black-and-white films
Films directed by B. Reeves Eason
1910s American films